Listener(s) or The Listener(s) may refer to:

Literature
 The Listener (magazine), a 1929–1991 British weekly covering broadcast media
 New Zealand Listener, a 1939–2020 weekly magazine covering politics and culture
 The Listeners (novel), a 1972 novel by James Gunn
 The Listeners, a 1912 poetry collection, or the title poem, by Walter de la Mare
 The Listeners, a 1970 novel by Monica Dickens
 The Listeners, a 2021 novel by Jordan Tannahill
 Ashema the Listener, a Marvel Comics character

Music
 Listener (band), an American spoken-word rock band
 The Listener (album), by Jeff Williams, 2013

Television
 The Listener (TV series), a 2009–2014 Canadian fantasy drama series
 Listeners, a 2020 Japanese anime series

Other uses
 Listener (computing) or event handler, in computer programming, a callback subroutine that handles inputs
 Listener, a prisoner in a UK jail trained by Samaritans to provide support to other prisoners

See also
 Hearing (sense)
 Listen (disambiguation)
 Listening (disambiguation)